Bostanabad (also Romanized as Bostānābād) is a city in the Central District of Bostanabad County, East Azerbaijan province, Iran, and serves as capital of the county. At the 2006 census, its population was 16,592 in 3,937 households. The following census in 2011 counted 17,954 people in 4,940 households. The latest census in 2016 showed a population of 21,734 people in 6,318 households.

References 

Bostanabad County

Cities in East Azerbaijan Province

Populated places in East Azerbaijan Province

Populated places in Bostanabad County